William V. Tamborlane (born August 25, 1946) has been Professor and Chief of Pediatric Endocrinology at Yale School of Medicine since 1986.

Biography and education 
Tamborlane grew up in Haworth, NJ, and raised his family in Madison, CT (wife and 3 children).

 Georgetown University, Washington D.C. B.S. 05/1968 Chemistry
 Georgetown University, School of Medicine M.D. 05/1972 Medicine
 Georgetown University Hospital Residency 06/1975 Pediatrics
 Georgetown University Hospital Chief Resident 06/1975 Pediatrics
 Yale University School of Medicine Postdoc 06/1976 Pediatric Endocrinology
 Yale University School of Medicine Postdoc 06/1977 Endocrinology, Medicine and Pediatrics
 He is board certificated in pediatric and adolescent endocrinology

Research 
The  focus of his work has been patient-oriented research in pediatric type 1 diabetes (T1D) and related metabolic and endocrine disorders.   Most of his >980 original articles, chapters and reviews are related to clinical and translational studies in diabetes. As Chair of the Diabetes Research in Children’s Network, Co-Chair of the JDRF CGM Study Group, and Vice Chair of the T1D Exchange Registry, he has been  involved in studies related to continuous glucose monitoring and other advanced diabetes technologies, as well as  randomized clinical trials of new drugs for adolescents with type 2 diabetes.

He was the first to demonstrate that insulin infusion pumps  markedly improve control of type 1 diabetes ). He then used pump therapy as a tool to show that many of the surrogate biomarkers of diabetic complications were reversed by intensive insulin therapy. Subsequently, with colleague Robert Sherwin, he helped form Kroc Study Group that carried out the feasibility study for the DCCT (a pivotal longitudinal diabetes study of intensive management that then evolved to the EDIC Study.

Most cited publications 
 Weiss R, Dziura J, Burgert TS, Tamborlane WV, Taksali SE, Yeckel CW, Allen K, Lopes M, Savoye M, Morrison J, Sherwin RS. Obesity and the metabolic syndrome in children and adolescents. New England journal of medicine. 2004 Jun 3;350(23):2362-74.(Cited 4756 times, according to Google Scholar  ) 
 Sinha R, Fisch G, Teague B, Tamborlane WV, Banyas B, Allen K, Savoye M, Rieger V, Taksali S, Barbetta G, Sherwin RS. Prevalence of impaired glucose tolerance among children and adolescents with marked obesity. New England journal of medicine. 2002 Mar 14;346(11):802-10.(Cited 2394 times, according to Google Scholar.)  
 Amiel SA, Sherwin RS, Simonson DC, Lauritano AA, Tamborlane WV. Impaired insulin action in puberty. New England Journal of Medicine. 1986 Jul 24;315(4):215-9. (Cited 1188 times, according to Google Scholar.)  
 Danne T, Nimri R, Battelino T, Bergenstal RM, Close KL, DeVries JH, Garg S, Heinemann L, Hirsch I, Amiel SA, Beck R. International consensus on use of continuous glucose monitoring. Diabetes care. 2017 Dec 1;40(12):1631-40.  (open access) (Cited 1005 times, according to Google Scholar.)

Honors 
 Tamborlane is a member of the Connecticut Academy of Science and Engineering
 2006 and 2011 JDRF Mary Tyler Moore and S. Robert Levine, M.D. Excellence in Clinical Research Award
 2009 Diabetes Technology Society’s Diabetes Technology Leadership Award
 2010 American Diabetes Association Outstanding Physician Clinician Award
 2011 National Award for Career Achievement and Contributions to Clinical and Translational Science by the Society for Clinical and Translational Science
 2014 International Society for Pediatric and Adolescent Diabetes (ISPAD) Prize for Achievement
 2017 American Diabetes Association Award for Achievement in Clinical Diabetes Research

References

External links
 Official Yale University School of Medicine website

1946 births
Living people
Yale School of Medicine faculty
People from Haworth, New Jersey
People from Madison, Connecticut
Georgetown College (Georgetown University) alumni
Yale School of Medicine alumni
Georgetown University School of Medicine alumni